"The Inbetweenies" is a song by Bill Oddie and recorded by The Goodies. It was released as a single in October 1974 with "Father Christmas Do Not Touch Me" on the B-side.

It entered the UK Singles Chart on 7 December 1974 at #41. It remained in the chart for 9 weeks, peaking at #7. 

In November 1974, the sides were reversed for the Christmas season with "Father Christmas Do Not Touch Me" released as a single with "The Inbetweenies" on the B-side. This technically made it a double A-side.

The song peaked at number 87 in Australia in 1975.

References

1974 songs
1974 singles
Songs written by Bill Oddie